The men's 4 × 100 metres relay event at the 1979 Summer Universiade was held at the Estadio Olimpico Universitario in Mexico City on 12 and 13 September 1979.

Results

Heats

Final

References

Athletics at the 1979 Summer Universiade
1979